Allan Trevor Rushmer (born 27 February 1944 in Birmingham) is a British former long-distance runner.

Athletics career
He competed in the 1968 Summer Olympics.

He represented England and won a bronze medal in the 3 miles race, at the 1966 British Empire and Commonwealth Games in Kingston, Jamaica.

Four years later he participated in the 5,000 metres at the 1970 British Commonwealth Games in Edinburgh, Scotland.

References

1944 births
Living people
Sportspeople from Birmingham, West Midlands
English male long-distance runners
Olympic athletes of Great Britain
Athletes (track and field) at the 1968 Summer Olympics
Athletes (track and field) at the 1966 British Empire and Commonwealth Games
Athletes (track and field) at the 1970 British Commonwealth Games
Commonwealth Games medallists in athletics
Commonwealth Games bronze medallists for England
Medallists at the 1966 British Empire and Commonwealth Games